David Wilmot (January 20, 1814 – March 16, 1868) was an American politician and judge. He served as Representative and a Senator for Pennsylvania and as a judge of the Court of Claims. He is best known for being the prime sponsor and eponym of the Wilmot Proviso, a failed proposal to ban the expansion of slavery to western lands gained in the Mexican Cession. A notable member of the anti-slavery Free Soil Party, Wilmot later was instrumental in establishing the Republican Party in Pennsylvania.

Education and career
Born on January 20, 1814, in Bethany, Pennsylvania, Wilmot completed preparatory studies at the local Beech Woods Academy and at the Cayuga Lake Academy at Aurora, Cayuga County, New York, then read law with Pennsylvania state judge William Jessup in Montrose, Pennsylvania and with George Washington Woodward in Wilkes-Barre, Pennsylvania in August 1834. He was admitted to the bar of Bradford County, Pennsylvania and entered private practice in Towanda, Bradford County, Pennsylvania from 1834 to 1844.

Congressional service
Wilmot was elected as a Democrat from Pennsylvania's 12th congressional district to the United States House of Representatives of the 29th, 30th and 31st United States Congresses, serving from March 4, 1845, to March 3, 1851.

Introducing the Wilmot Proviso
Upon taking his seat in Congress, Wilmot initially supported the policies of Democratic President James K. Polk. He also became part of an informal group of anti-slavery Democrats led by New York Congressman Preston King, who was a protege of Governor Silas Wright and an ally of former President Martin Van Buren. Although Wilmot opposed the extension of slavery into the territories, he was generally considered to be a Democratic Party loyalist; he supported Polk in the initiation of the Mexican–American War and was the lone House Democrat from Pennsylvania to vote for the Walker tariff. However, during Polk's presidency, anti-slavery Northern Democrats increasingly came to view Polk as unduly favorable to Southern interests. They were specifically disappointed by Polk's decision to compromise with Britain over the partition of Oregon, as well as Polk's veto of an internal improvements bill. As James G. Blaine later wrote:

In August 1846, an appropriations bill for $2 million to be used by the President in negotiating a treaty of peace with Mexico was introduced in the United States House of Representatives. Wilmot immediately offered the following amendment:

"Provided, That, as an express and fundamental condition to the acquisition of any territory from the Republic of Mexico by the United States, by virtue of any treaty which may be negotiated between them, and to the use by the Executive of the moneys herein appropriated, neither slavery nor involuntary servitude shall ever exist in any part of said territory, except for crime, whereof the party shall first be duly convicted."

Wilmot modeled the language for what would usually be referred to as the Wilmot Proviso after the Northwest Ordinance of 1787. Unlike some Northern Whigs, Wilmot and other anti-slavery Democrats were largely unconcerned by the issue of racial equality, and instead opposed the expansion of slavery because they believed the institution was detrimental to the "laboring white man". Historian Sean Wilentz writes that it is unclear why Wilmot, an "unremarkable" first-term Congressman, was the one to introduce the measure. Wilmot would later claim that he had introduced the proviso independent of any other members of Congress, while Congressman Jacob Brinkerhoff claimed that he was the true author of the proviso. Wilentz speculates that the proviso was jointly drafted by Wilmot and other anti-slavery Democrats, and that the drafters agreed that whoever had the first opportunity to introduce the proviso would do so.

In a February 1847 debate over the Priviso, Wilmot explained that he was not an abolitionist, and was not seeking to abolish slavery in the Southern states, but simply wanted to preserve the integrity of free territories that did not have slavery and did not want it:

 
In an 1848 speech, Wilmot responded to critics who called him a radical abolitionist by pointing to Thomas Jefferson's proposed Land Ordinance of 1784, which would have banned slavery in a large portion of western territory slated for federal expansion.

The House, after first voting down a counter-proposal simply to extend the Missouri Compromise line across the Mexican Cession, passed the proviso by a vote of 83–64. This led to an attempt to table the entire appropriations bill rather than pass it with "the obnoxious proviso attached", but this effort was defeated "in an ominously sectional vote, 78–94". The United States Senate adjourned rather than approve the bill with the proviso.

Free Soil movement

A measure to the Wilmot Proviso was brought forward at the next session of Congress, with the appropriation amount increased to $3 million, and the scope of the amendment expanded to include all future territory which might be acquired by the United States. This was passed in the House by a vote of 115 to 105, but the Senate refused to concur and passed a bill of its own without the amendment. The House acquiesced, owing largely to the influence of General Lewis Cass. As the 1848 presidential election took shape, the Democrats rejected the Wilmot Proviso in their platform and selected Cass as their candidate to run on a popular sovereignty platform. The new Free Soil Party rallied around the Wilmot Proviso, and nominated Martin Van Buren on a platform calling for "No more slave states and no more slave territory."

By 1848 Wilmot was thoroughly identified as a Free Soiler, but, like many other Free Soilers, he did not oppose the expansion of slavery based on a legal rejection of the short-term existence of the institution itself, but rather because he felt slavery was detrimental to the interests of whites.  In fact, he sometimes referred to the Wilmot proviso as the "White Man's Proviso". In a speech in the House, Wilmot said, "I plead the cause and the rights of white freemen [and] I would preserve to free white labor a fair country, a rich inheritance, where the sons of toil, of my own race and own color, can live without the disgrace which association with negro slavery brings upon free labor." Around the same time, however, Wilmot, in a New York speech, spoke of the ultimate demise of slavery when he argued, "Keep it within given limits ...and in time it will wear itself out. Its existence can only be perpetuated by constant expansion. ... Slavery has within itself the seeds of its own destruction."

Wilmot was presented as the Free Soil candidate for Speaker of the United States House of Representatives in 1849 and was soon at odds with the mainstream Pennsylvania Democratic Party led by James Buchanan. Wilmot was forced to withdraw from the 1850 Congressional elections in favor of the more moderate Galusha A. Grow.

State judicial service
Wilmot was President Judge of the Pennsylvania Court of Common Pleas for the Thirteenth Judicial District from 1851 to 1861. He took a leading part in the founding of the Republican Party in 1854. He was Chairman of the Republican Party platform committee, was a delegate to the 1856 Republican National Convention and worked vigorously for the first Republican presidential candidate, John C. Fremont, in the 1856 election. He was an unsuccessful Republican candidate for Governor of Pennsylvania in 1857, losing to William F. Packer.

Later Congressional service
Wilmot was elected as a Republican to the United States Senate to fill the vacancy caused by the resignation of United States Senator Simon Cameron and served from March 14, 1861, to March 3, 1863. He was not a candidate for reelection in 1862. He was a member of the Peace Convention of 1861, held in Washington, D.C., in an effort to devise means to prevent the impending American Civil War.

Federal judicial service
Wilmot was nominated by President Abraham Lincoln on March 6, 1863, to the Court of Claims (later the United States Court of Claims), to a new seat authorized by 12 Stat. 765. He was confirmed by the United States Senate on March 7, 1863, and received his commission the same day. His service terminated upon his death on March 16, 1868. He was interred in Riverside Cemetery in Towanda.

Family

Wilmot was the son of Randall (1792–1876) and Mary (née Grant) Wilmot (1792–1820). His father was a well-to-do merchant, and David's early life was a comfortable one. In 1836, he married Anna Morgan. The couple had three children, none of whom survived childhood.

Legacy and honors
 A Pennsylvania State historical marker is placed at Williams Street at the Riverside Cemetery, Towanda, identifying the cemetery as his resting place.
 The Wilmot House was added to the National Register of Historic Places in 1974, and David Wilmot School in 1988.

References

Sources

 
 Berwanger, Eugene H. The Frontier Against Slavery: Western Anti-Negro Prejudice and the Slavery Extension Controversy. (1967) .
 Foner, Eric. Free Soil, Free Labor, Free Men: The Ideology of the Republican Party Before the Civil War. (1970) .
 Levine, Bruce. Half Slave and Half Free: The Roots of Civil War. (1992).
 McKnight, Brian D., article on David Wilmot in Encyclopedia of the American Civil War, edited by David S. Heidler and Jeanne T. Heidler, 2000, .
 Morrison, Michael A. Slavery and the American West: The Eclipse of Manifest Destiny and the Coming of the Civil War. (1997) .

External links

 
 

1814 births
1868 deaths
19th-century American judges
19th-century American politicians
Democratic Party members of the United States House of Representatives from Pennsylvania
Free Soil Party members of the United States House of Representatives
Judges of the Pennsylvania Courts of Common Pleas
Judges of the United States Court of Claims
Pennsylvania Free Soilers
Pennsylvania Republicans
People from Bethany, Pennsylvania
People from Towanda, Pennsylvania
Republican Party United States senators from Pennsylvania
United States Article I federal judges appointed by Abraham Lincoln
United States federal judges admitted to the practice of law by reading law